HC Midtjylland is a handball club based in the town of Herning in Jutland, Denmark. They play in Danish 1st Division.

In 2018 they went bankrupt because of financial problems. The club resurrected, shortly after it went bankrupt, but was forced into the Danish 2nd Division.

European record

Accomplishments
Danish Handball Cup: 1
: 2015

Team

Current squad

 
Goalkeepers 
 1  René Villadsen
 12  Hans-Christian Borg Hansen
 20  Frederik Hummelmose
Wingers  
LW
 35  Kasper Søndergaard Kvist
 44  Frederik Sass
RW
 27  Jonathan Havndrup Sørensen
 40  Laurits Krtistensen
 90  Magnus Møland Sønnichsen
Line players
 6  Valdemar Hermansen
 9  Jeppe Krogh Ejlersen
 13  Mathias Hedegaard
 33  Kasper Didriksen
 
Back players 
LB
 7  Sebastian Jensen 
 23  Bjarke Nybo Jørgensen
 32  Andreas Thomsen
CB
 3  Bertram Simonsen
 4  Rasmus Graffe
 11  Christopher Ekmann
 14  Mikkel Madsen
 25  Mathias Nikolajsen
RB
 2  Markus Falk Ibesen
 10  Jonas Tønnes Langerhuus
 15  Rasmus Madsen

Transfers 
Transfers for the 2023–2024 season

Joining
  Claus Urhenholdt (Head coach)
  Arne Damgaard (Assistant coach) (from  Skive fH)
  Kim Sonne (GK) (from  Fredericia HK)
  Magnus Kronborg (CB) (from  Nordsjælland Håndbold)
  Søren Tau Sørensen (P) (from  Skive fH)

Leaving
  Mads Hjortshøj (Head coach) (to  Aarhus HC) 
  Søren Baadsgaard (Assistant coach)
  René Villadsen (GK)
  Frederik Hummelmose (GK)
  Andreas Thomsen (LB)
  Mathias Nikolajsen (CB) (to  Høj Elite)
  Jonas Langerhuus (RB) (to  Fredericia HK)
  Kasper Didriksen (P) (to  Mors-Thy Håndbold)
  Mathias Hedegaard (P)
  Jeppe Krogh Ejlersen (P)

Technical staff
Staff for the 2022–2023 season
  Head coach: Mads Hjortshøj
  Assistant Coach: Søren Baadsgaard
  Team Leader: Henrik Andersen
  Physiotherapist: Lasse Andsbjerg

References

Danish handball clubs
Handball clubs established in 2005
2005 establishments in Denmark